Perucola picturata is a species of "jewel beetles" in the subfamily Polycestinae, the only species in the genus Perucola.

References

Monotypic Buprestidae genera